Robert F. Beck (born 1943) is the Richard B. Couch Professor of Naval Architecture and Marine Engineering at the University of Michigan. 
He is the editor of the Journal of Ship Research.

Education and career

B.S.E. University of Michigan, 1965; Naval Architecture & Marine Engineering

B.S.E. University of Michigan, 1965; Aeronautical & Astronautical Engineering

S.M. M.I.T., 1967; Naval Architecture & Marine Engineering

N.A. M.I.T., 1968; Naval Architecture & Marine Engineering

Ph.D. M.I.T., 1970; Naval Architecture & Marine Engineering

Selected publications

References

1943 births
Living people
University of Michigan faculty
University of Michigan College of Engineering alumni
MIT School of Engineering alumni